John Joseph Nicolella (May 28, 1945 – February 21, 1998) was an American film  director, film producer, television director, and television producer. He is best known for his directing and producing work on the 1980s television series Miami Vice.

Career
Nicolella began his career working as an assistant director on the Ivan Passer-directed film Born to Win (1971). Other films soon followed, the Paul Newman-directed film The Effect of Gamma Rays on Man-in-the-Moon Marigolds (1972), Crazy Joe (1974) starring Peter Boyle, Sweet Revenge (1976) starring Stockard Channing and Sam Waterston and Time Square (1980). He was also as a production manager on the films Saturday Night Fever (1977), Curse of the Pink Panther (1983) and co-produced Easy Money starring Rodney Dangerfield, Joe Pesci, and Jennifer Jason Leigh.

In 1984, he joined the production crew of Miami Vice directing a number of episodes until 1987. He continued working with the show's star Don Johnson directing the music video short film for Johnson's song "Heartbeat" from the album of the same name. They reunited again when Nicolella served as executive producer for eight episodes of Nash Bridges.

Nicolella's other directorial television credits include M.A.N.T.I.S., Crime Story, Leg Work, Gabriel's Fire, Dark Justice, Melrose Place, Key West, Marker and Super Force.

He also directed a number of television films, most notably Mike Hammer: Murder Takes All (1989) and Rock Hudson (1990), as well as all four of the Vanishing Son films. He also directed the theatrical features Sunset Heat (1992) and Kull the Conqueror (1997), his final directing credit before his death in 1998.

Death
Nicolella died on February 21, 1998. He is survived by his wife, Patti Kent Nicolella, daughters Jennifer, Cynthia and Sofia, a son, Nicholas and sister Loretta Bruccoleri.

References

External links

1945 births
1998 deaths
American film directors
American film producers
American television directors
American television producers
Place of birth missing
20th-century American businesspeople